Kynan Robinson is an Australian trombonist and composer. He is most commonly associated with jazz but also performs and composes in many other styles.

Career
Robinson was born in Australia but spent his childhood in Bangladesh as a child of Christian missionary parents. They lived there for fifteen years and were the only white people in the village. He returned to Australia to complete high school. His career and accomplishments are remarkable in their own right but take on extra significance when one considers the breadth of fields he has excelled in. He is a composer and musician with a formidable record and reputation.  His extensive, diverse and very well regarded and reviewed body of work, place him in a position of status and reputation with the Australian art scene.   He received a bachelor's degree in music from the Victorian College of the Arts which he built on completing a Masters In Composition in 2010.

Robinson formed a contemporary improvisation quintet named En Rusk performing his open original compositions. The band toured Australia a number of times. They recorded their debut self-titled CD in 2001 and in 2004 finished their second recording, 1000 Wide. In 2005 he formed The Escalators, which released an album entitled Wrapped in Plastic, compositions and concepts inspired by the films of David Lynch. He also established a reputation in electronic/techno/sample-based music. Continuing his recording and touring career mainly with the iconic and iconoclastic dance/performance act, Des Peres (originally known as Old Des Peres) and second with Hard Hat, a group that brings together electronic and acoustic musicians. Both acts toured Australia and internationally regularly performing at the largest summer festivals around Australia and internationally. Des Peres completed their debut album in 2004. The album was released through Flict/Shock. Their second album Ace Doubt was released in 2006 through Flit/MGM. Des Peres combines a theatrical stage approach with a sample-heavy sound. While playing with the band, Robinson adopts the name Old Des and works very with Luva DJ (Michelle Robinson) and Mr. Ection (visual artist and brother Kiron Robinson) as well as guitarist Tom Bass and Kelsey James. Their third album was entitled The Adventures of Cowboy and Miniman.

His musical output and vast creativity is reflected in his ability to genre hop with seeming ease. In 2010 he formed co-led the groundbreaking Australian Jazz band  Collider, a band he co-leads with Melbourne saxophonist Adam Simmons. Combining a traditional jazz ensemble with orchestral and improvising string players the uniqueness of the ensembles sound couple with their outstandingly high-performance ability created the space Robinson needed to write and perform his most courageous and what many in the Australian media consider his most personal works. "Solo in Red" was a large form composition composed by Robinson, performed by Collider  and commissioned by the Melbourne Writers Festival. Its thematic material was drawn from  the writings of American novelist Cormac McCarthy. In particular his epic novel Blood Meridian. Beyond music the completed work also involved a highly technical and moving video work, a lighting design and narration with excerpts from the book narrated on stage. Solo in Red was released as an Audi recording at the same time then and also rebased a second album titled Words. With the majority of the music inspired by authors Robinson and Simmons had personal affinity to it was appropriately titled "Words".

Over a 30-year career Robinson has toured and recorded with many of Melbourne and Australia's leading, musical innovators including C.W. Stoneking, Brian Brown, and the Melbourne Ska Orchestra, The Adam Simmons Toy Band, BucketRider, and countless more.  He has composed music for jazz ensembles, dance productions, musical theatre, contemporary classical ensembles, and electronic dance acts and has had his compositions performed in festivals around the world. In 2001 he was a collaborative composer for Double Venturi, a collaborative piece involving musicians and funded by Arts Victoria. In 2004 he received funding through the Australia Council to compose a concert-length work for prepared piano and small ensemble that was premiered at the Wangaratta Festival of Jazz. He also has scored the music to six short films and has collaborated in numerous cross arts projects with visual artists including Kiron Robinson, Narinda Reevers, and Dave Macleod. Robinson has won three ARIA awards, considered Australis's top musical prize.

Contribution to the Field of Education 
Research - Complexity, Creativity, Identity

Beyond music he is considered one of Australia's leading voices in the field of systemic educational change. His doctoral thesis, titled Enabling Collective Creativity in Schools using Minecraft: Serious Play   framed learning and education within complexity thinking and is considered an important addition to contemporary Western Education. The unique approach Robinson took to every aspect of the research including the findings have been used as guideposts for how education might consider its move forward.  Dr. Dennis Sumara  a leading researcher and writer in the fields of complexity thinking and education  wrote of Robinson's work "Kynan Robinson has written an exceptional dissertation, one that challenges not only genre and form of the dissertation but also the very methods used by educational researchers. By combining expository, narrative and explicitly fictional text Robinson as author performs the very theories he is exploring. In so doing, both the written forms and the theoretical positions both undermine and exceed one another. It is a wholly unique presentation of both the process and products...I consider this work by Robinson to be an important contribution to the field of education. The work is unique, creative and, in important ways disruptive."

Situated in complexity theory the thesis covered the broad area of creativity re-conceptualise creativity within Australian mainstream education, as being something that continually emerges from collective process. In doing so, many of the key characteristics of the Australian education system, were analysed for the role they played in enabling or hindering creativity within a school. Minecraft  was a key pedagogical tool used to filter this aspects through to reimagine them.

The research was situated within a larger Australian Research Council funded linkage project, LP110200309, Serious play: Using digital games in school to promote literacy and learning in the twenty-first century (Beavis et al. 2011-2014).

The data for Robinson's research were generated from the narratives of 136 students, five teachers and a primary school situated in the inner suburbs of Melbourne. Their story revolves around a 10-week unit of work which saw the 136 students experientially leave this earth and inhabit another planet, Aurora 56Z. Aurora 56Z was located within the game Minecraft.

Creativity was central to the work. Robinson re-conceptualised creativity within Australian mainstream education, shifting its definition away from an individual-centred perspective to a complexity-framed definition; something that is socially constructed and evident as emergent phenomenon rising from adaptive complex systems. In doing so, many of the key characteristics of the Australian education system, such as its complexity, its hierarchical systemic structure and also the minutiae that make up a school environment including curriculum, architecture, reflection practice and tools, and teaching and pedagogy, were analysed for the role they played in enabling or hindering creativity within a school.

Complexity theory was fundamental to all aspects of this research project. It framed and shaped the design of both the thesis and the 10 week unit of work being studied. It was the binding lens through which data was extracted and analysed.

Non-conventional methods of data collection included the Minecraft server and the student-produced Wiki. Both of these digital platforms became data repositories, holding and mapping the majority of the learning and teaching that happened before, during and after the 10 weeks allocated to this unit of work.

In Robinson's words - "I immersed myself in the world of the students, teachers and school as I wrote this thesis, leading to the development of my exploratory and practice led approach to the data analysis. In the process of analysing the server data I wrote a novel, set on Aurora 56Z, casting the young people as the characters and the ‘ruins’ of the server as the setting.

This immersion in the world, and reinterpretation of the stagnant server into a lively text based upon what I found on the server and the students’ Wiki pages, helped me to understand more deeply the creative learning process of the curriculum unit."

While the type and scale were unique, this method of data generation and analysis does build upon the limited literature on post-qualitative method. In doing so, it offers a different way to think about methodology.

The findings of this study included:

1. Situating pedagogies framed in complexity have limited scope in the current discourse around mainstream Australian education.

2. There is a role for pedagogies that arise out of new and conflicting discourses (e.g., complexity theory). Its place and role are one of continual ‘deterritorialization and reterritorialization’ (Deleuze & Guattari 1987; Roy 2003). Despite existing only on the edge of the discourse, their mere existence is evidence of the potential for change.

3. Digital games based on complexity, such as the MMO game Minecraft, have a place in education and are enablers of systemic creativity.

4. The students in the study were developing new and previously unnamed multithreaded identities through their complex game design and play. Robinson labelled this new form of identity Vellooming.

The conclusions revealed throughout have enriched future theorisation about the use of new pedagogies framed in complexity, the ‘how’ and ‘why’ of education, and the use of Massively Multiplayer Online (MMO) games such as Minecraft.

The research also added to the small but growing knowledge base of research methodologies framed in complexity, providing a viable and visible account of how to work with key concepts of postmodern emergence.

A Velloming Identity 
"Robinson described a Vellooming Identity as one that that is in a state of constant shifting, never still, and constantly emerging. Vellooming is a fictional word used to describe the experience many children have when they join the online world. It is a form of transportation, movement, and exploration. It can be free of the bounds of time, space, and gravity, and instead is multidimensional. This research argues for a new form of identity made possible by the digital world. I have named it a Vellooming identity." 
 
"A rudimentary understanding and simplistic description of Vellooming would be to describe it as the ability to...or the act of...travelling across, to, and from multiple Structures—to change Looms."

The frame to understand a Vellooming identity is poststructuralism. A vellooming identity might be seen as conceptually similar to Deleuze's ideas of identities of 'nomadic thought' and his use of the rhizome. There are also commonalities in Foucault's Theory of Discourse  in that when describing a Vellooming identity Robinson rejects the idea of the self as an absolute, rather viewing it as a controlling agent of power created by Reductionism. Where Robinson's Vellooming Identity moves forward from Deleuze's and Foucault's positions is where he finds  links to the connected web. A Vellooming identity is not linked to time but rather other, and in the idea of continually becoming other.

His doctoral thesis and publications since have also demanded for a new understanding of what learning is and offered a redefining of creativity.  Robinson redefines creativity as a continual, collective experience. In this he shifts significantly from the standard reductionist and modernist definitions. In their framing identity is intrinsically tied to the idea of the individual and it is measurable e.g. he or she is creative, he.. less so. In these framings it is also often presented as a trait that one might process. The reductionist definition embraces the identity of the creative genius as the measure of creativity. Comparatively, in Robinson's understanding phrases such as emergence and continual becoming as metaphors for this new definition.   By doing so he links it to the Vellooming identity. The Vellooming Identity and Collective Creativity as emergence have strong parallels to similar emerging identities he speaks of often in his work, identities of Continually Becoming Other.  
 

His redefining of creativity linked to the naming of a new form of identity has opened up new possibilities in the space of learning, knowledge and formal education.

Business 
In 2020 Robinson founded the Global Consultancy firm EnRusk. It was with this organisation that Robinson  began to enact the theoretical ideas alongside the processes and tools he had developed over a lifetime of study and creation. The firm's focus was always complete, systemic, global educational reform. Robinson believed the change went beyond education to what he referred to as a global mindset. He is committed to help shift the global mindset away from the dominant reductionist mindset to a connected one nested in Complexity. Robinson company was formed to enact this change and in that the resultant ways of being and doing.  Increased connectivity, collective learning and collective creativity are at the heart of both the theoretical frame and the work that results.

At its heart his work rejects Reductionism and replaces it with a world view that embraces ambiguity continual change and continual creativity. Again, the idea of the self is non existent in this theoretical space replaced with an identity of continual becoming other. His achievements and creations across every field he works is be that music, education, commerce and technology have always displayed this mindset and have been tools of communication for Robinson.

In 2010 he was recognised and awarded with the ICTEV Educational Leader of the Year Award.

He is considered a leader in the field of Complexity Thinking as it relates to Education and the Arts.

Discography

As leader
 En Rusk (Newmarket Music) 2001
 En Rusk – 1000 Wide (Newmarket Music) 2003
 Old Des Peres – Preserved (Flict/Shock) 2004
 Des Peres – Ace Doubt (Flict/MGM)2006
 Des Peres – The Adventures of Cowboy and Miniman (House of Pow/Amphead)2008
 The Escalators – Wrapped in Plastic (Jazz Head)
 Collider – Words (House of Pow)
 Collider – Solo In Red (House of Pow)

As sideman
 Adam Simmons Toy Band – Happy Jacket
 Melbourne Acid Techno (Dark Matter Records)
 Sample Synthesis 4 and 5 (Clan Analogue Records)
 Paul Colman Trio – Turn (Control Records)
 Matt Fagan
 Malone – This is it (Cavalier Music)
 The Mavis's – Throwing Little Stones (FMR)
 City City City (Remote Control Records)
 Skazz of Melbourne
 5+2 Ensemble – Invisible Cities and other Works (Rufus)
 C.W. Stoneking – Jungle Blues
 Melbourne Ska Orchestra

Remixes
 Machine Translations (Spunk)

Film scores
 The Only Person in the World – Ben Chessell
 3 Weeks in Koh Samui - Alistair Reid
 From The Top – Alistair Reid
 Is God a DJ – Ben Chessell

Installations
 Double Venturi – Collaborative composition with Garth Paine 2001
 The Slow Burn – Collaborative composition with Erik Griswold 2004

Grants and awards
 Australia Council Promotion and Presentation (En Rusk Recording) 2004
 Australia Council New Works 2005
 Arts Victoria Music for the Future Recording (Des Peres) 2005
 Arts Victoria Music For The Future Touring (Des Peres) 2005
 D.C.I.T.A. Touring (Des Peres) 2005

References

7. O'Mara, J. and Robinson, K., 2017. Mining the Cli-Fi world: renegotiating the curriculum using Minecraft. Serious play: literacy, learning and digital games, pp. 114–131.
8. Robinson, K., 2014. Games, Problem Based Learning and Minecraft. The Journal of Digital Learning and Teaching Victoria, 1(1), pp. 32–45.

Robinson, K., 2014. Games, Problem Based Learning and Minecraft. The Journal of Digital Learning and Teaching Victoria, 1(1), pp. 32–45.

External links
 Official website

Living people
Australian jazz trombonists
21st-century trombonists
Year of birth missing (living people)